Saint Meinhard (b. 1134 or 1136 - died August 14 or October 11, 1196) was a German Augustinian canon regular and the first Bishop of Livonia. His life was described in the Chronicle of Henry of Livonia. His body rests in the now-Lutheran Riga Cathedral, as his remains were moved to Riga in 1226. He is venerated as the apostle of the Church in Latvia (Livonia in the Middle Ages).

As a canon at the Segeberg Abbey in Holstein, Meinhard was possibly inspired by Vicelinus missionary work among the Slavs. Meinhard traveled with Lübeck merchants, probably trading costly furs, to Livonia on a Catholic mission in the 1170s or early 1180s to convert pagan Semigallians, Latgalians, and Livonians into Christianity. He settled on the Daugava River at Ikšķile (German: Üxküll) southeast of Riga. In 1185–1186, he built a stone church, dedicated to Our Lady. Following an attack by the Lithuanians, Meinhard brought stonemasons from Gotland to build a fortress to defend against future attacks from raiders from Lithuania looking to carry off slaves. These were the first known stone buildings among the Baltic tribes. Remains of the church survive to this day. Another stone castle was built in Salaspils (German: Holm) as a gift to newly converted pagans. But the inhabitants rebelled and attacked Meinhard attempting to drive him out of Livonia.

When he briefly returned to Germany in 1186, Meinhard was consecrated as Bishop of Üxküll (present-day Ikšķile, Latvia) by Hartwig of Uthlede, Archbishop of Bremen. The new bishopric was confirmed by Pope Clement III in September 1188. In 1190, Clement III allowed any monk to join Meinhard's mission. New Pope Celestine III showed more enthusiastic support for the mission in his letter in April 1193, authorizing active missionary recruitment, making exceptions to rules governing monks' food and clothing, and granting indulgences to those who joined the mission. Among the recruits was Theodorich from Loccum Abbey, who started a mission in Turaida (German: Treyden). Meinhard initially converted the pagans by peaceful means, but faced with resistance and apostasy, he turned to the idea of a crusade.

Meinhard was succeeded by Berthold of Hanover and Albert of Riga, who began the Livonian Crusade and established the Livonian Brothers of the Sword, a crusading military order, in Riga.

In September 1993, Pope John Paul II paid a visit to the Baltic states and solemnly proclaimed on 8 September of that year that he formally restores the veneration of Saint Meinhard on 14 August each year, which is considered as an equipollent canonization.

References

12th-century births
1196 deaths
People from Segeberg
German Roman Catholic missionaries
Canonical Augustinian bishops
12th-century Roman Catholic bishops in Livonia
Prince-bishops in Livonia
Burials in Latvia
12th-century Christian saints
Canonical Augustinian saints
German Roman Catholic saints
Canonizations by Pope John Paul II
Roman Catholic missionaries in Estonia
Roman Catholic missionaries in Latvia